Mesovouno, known before 1927 as Karmishta, is a village and a community of the Eordaia municipality. Before the 2011 local government reform it was part of the municipality of Vermio, of which it was a municipal district. The 2011 census recorded 407 inhabitants in the village.

History 
In October 1941 and April 1944, during the Axis occupation of Greece, the Wehrmacht perpetrated the Mesovouno massacres in the village. A total of 268 civilians were killed.

References

Populated places in Kozani (regional unit)